Hamford Water is a  biological Site of Special Scientific Interest between Walton-on-the-Naze and Harwich in Essex. The site is a tidal inlet which has marsh grasslands, creeks, mud and sand flats, salt marshes, islands and beaches. It is described by Natural England as "of international importance for breeding little terns and wintering dark-bellied brent geese, wildfowl and waders, and of national importance for many other bird species." Rare plants include hog's fennel and slender hare's-ear. The main invertebrates are worms and thin-shelled molluscs. The largest island, Horsey Island, can be reached on foot at low tide across The Wade from Kirby-le-Soken.

It is also a Ramsar site, a Special Protection Area, a Nature Conservation Review site, and most of it is a National Nature Reserve. Two small areas, Skippers Island and John Weston Nature Reserve, are managed by the Essex Wildlife Trust.

Most of Bramble Island (now part of the mainland) is used by Exchem for explosives testing.

The area was used as the basis for Arthur Ransome's novel Secret Water.

See also
 Beaumont Cut

References

Special Protection Areas in England
Sites of Special Scientific Interest in Essex
Nature Conservation Review sites
Coastal environment of Essex
Ramsar sites in England
National nature reserves in England